Scott Jensen (born August 24, 1960) is a businessman and former Republican legislator from Wisconsin.

Early life
Born in Waukesha, Wisconsin, Jensen attended Mukwonago High School and graduated from Drake University in 1982. He received a master's degree in public policy from Harvard University's Kennedy School of Government in 1984.

After receiving his graduate degree, Jensen worked in public relations, working as Director of Government Relations for Wisconsin Manufacturers and Commerce from 1984 to 1987.

Career
Jensen began in politics by working as the staff director of the Wisconsin Assembly's Republican caucus from 1987 to 1990, serving under Assembly minority leader David Prosser, Jr. While there, he ran the first campaign of John Gard for the Wisconsin Assembly in 1987. Jensen then worked as chief of staff for Wisconsin governor Tommy Thompson from 1990 to 1992.

Public office
In 1992, Jensen was elected to the Wisconsin State Assembly, representing the 32nd district, in a special election. In the special election primary in December 1991, Jensen barely defeated fellow Republican Donald Wilson, 1474 to 1436.  He won the general special election against Democrat Shirley Wheelter in January 1992 by a two-to-one margin. Jensen was unopposed in the general election that year, and won by wide margins in elections in 1994, 1996, 1998, and 2000. In 2002, due to redistricting, Jensen was re-elected to the Assembly representing the 98th district, where he was unopposed in 2004.

Jensen served in the Assembly until 2006. Jensen served as majority leader from 1994 to 1995 and speaker from 1995 to 2002.

In the fall of 2002, Jensen and other legislative leaders were ensnared in a caucus scandal. He was charged with three felonies and one misdemeanor, including misconduct in public office and using state resources for campaigns. He was found guilty on all counts and sentenced to 15 months in prison. He appealed, and a new trial was ordered. He settled on a plea deal, whereby the felony charges were dropped in exchange for a plea of no contest on the misdemeanor charge. He served no jail time.

Current activities
Jensen works in the private sector with the Alliance for School Choice and Chartwell Strategic Advisors.

Notes

Politicians from Waukesha, Wisconsin
Drake University alumni
Harvard Kennedy School alumni
Speakers of the Wisconsin State Assembly
Republican Party members of the Wisconsin State Assembly
1960 births
Living people
Wisconsin politicians convicted of crimes
21st-century American politicians
People from Waukesha, Wisconsin